Leptodeuterocopus duchicela is a moth of the family Pterophoridae. It is known from Ecuador.

The wingspan is 14–15 mm. Adults are on wing in January.

External links
 

Deuterocopinae